The I Beach South American Games was a multi-sport event held from 2 to 13 December 2009 in Montevideo and Punta del Este, Uruguay. The Games was organized by the South American Sports Organization (ODESUR).

Participating teams
15 nations of the Organización Deportiva Suramericana (ODESUR) competed in these Beach Games.

 
 
 
 
 
 
 
 
 
 
 
 
 
  (Host)

Medal count
The medal count for these Beach Games is tabulated below. This table is sorted by the number of gold medals earned by each country.  The number of silver medals is taken into consideration next, and then the number of bronze medals.

Sports

Beach handball
Beach rugby
Beach soccer
Beach volleyball
Fitness (demonstration)
Marathon swimming
Sailing
Surfing
Triathlon
Water ski

References

External links
Official website

Beach South American Games
Punta del Este
2009 in South American sport
Multi-sport events in Uruguay
International sports competitions hosted by Uruguay
Sports competitions in Montevideo
South American Beach Games
December 2009 sports events in South America
2000s in Montevideo